The 2007–08 Boston Bruins season  began on October 5, 2007. It was the 84th season of the Boston Bruins in the National Hockey League (NHL).

The Bruins entered the 2007–08 season with a new head coach after the team fired Dave Lewis shortly before the 2007 NHL Entry Draft.

Key dates prior to the start of the season:

The 2007 NHL Entry Draft took place in Columbus, Ohio, on June 22–23.
The free agency period began on July 1.

Regular season

Divisional standings

Conference standings

Schedule and results

Playoffs
The Bruins qualified for the NHL's Stanley Cup Playoffs for the first time since the 2003–04 NHL season, facing their traditional arch-rivals, the Montreal Canadiens.
The Boston Bruins were down 3–1 in the series facing elimination, but climbed back to 3–3. The series moved to game 7 in Montreal on April 21, however the Bruins lost the game and were narrowly eliminated.

 Scorer of game-winning goal in italics

Player statistics

Skaters

Note: GP = Games played; G = Goals; A = Assists; Pts = Points; +/− = Plus-minus; PIM = Penalty minutes

Goaltenders
Note: GPI = Games Played In; MIN = Minutes played; GAA = Goals against average; W = Wins; L = Losses; OT = Overtime/shootout losses; SO = Shutouts; SA = Shots Against; GA = Goals against; SV%= Save percentage

Awards and records

Records

Milestones

Transactions
The Bruins have been involved in the following transactions during the 2007–08 season.

Trades

Free agents

Draft picks
Boston's picks at the 2007 NHL Entry Draft in Columbus, Ohio.  The Bruins will pick 8th overall when the draft is held June 22–23.

Farm teams

Providence Bruins
The Providence Bruins remain Boston's top affiliate in the American Hockey League in 2007–08.

Johnstown Chiefs
On June 18, 2007, during the ECHL Board of Governors Annual Meeting, the Long Beach Ice Dogs membership in the ECHL was immediately terminated due to the Long Beach ownership group being unable to continue to operate in 2007–08. On September 18, 2007, the Johnstown Chiefs of the ECHL announced they had entered an affiliation agreement with the Bruins for the 2007–08 season.

See also
2006–07 NHL season

References

Player stats: Boston Bruins player stats on espn.com
Game log: Boston Bruins game log on espn.com
Team standings: NHL standings on espn.com

Boston Bruins seasons
Boston Bruins
Boston Bruins
Boston Bruins
Boston Bruins
Bruins
Bruins